2009 Roasso Kumamoto season

Competitions

Player statistics

Other pages
 J. League official site

Roasso Kumamoto
Roasso Kumamoto seasons